O with turned comma above right (uppercase Oʻ, lowercase oʻ) is the 25th letter of the Uzbek Latin alphabet, representing the close-mid back rounded vowel . It was adopted in the  revision of the alphabet, replacing Ö. It was also used in the Karakalpak alphabet until 2016, when it was replaced with Ó. In the Uzbek Cyrillic alphabet, it corresponds to Ў.

Encodings

See also
 Ö
 Short U (Cyrillic)

References

Latin letters with diacritics
Uzbek language